Ryann Kirby Redmond is an American actress and singer known for originating the role of Bridget in Bring It On: The Musical. She performed on Broadway in the musical If/Then, which closed on March 22, 2015, and became the first female actor to portray Olaf in Frozen on Broadway, in 2019.

Personal life
Born and raised in Alpharetta and Cumming, Georgia, she is the daughter of Andrea (Elvey) and Webb Redmond, a former marine and police officer. Her parents are divorced, both remarried, and she has 6 siblings/step siblings between them. She attended South Forsyth High School where she was involved with theatre. In 2006 she won a Breakthrough Performance Award at the Georgia One-Act competition. After graduating, she studied musical theatre in the CAP21 program at New York University's Tisch School of the Arts on a full scholarship, but she left college when she was cast in Bring It On: The Musical.

Career
In 2010, Redmond performed as Alice in the Elizabeth Swados musical Alice at the Palace. Meryl Streep had played Alice in the original Off-Broadway production. She also performed in Swados' musical Books Cook!, earning standout reviews. Redmond continued to participate in Broadway Dreams Foundation workshops, and in 2011 while she was performing at a NY Benefit, Bernie Telsey admired her talent and asked her to come in the next day to read for Bridget in Bring It On: The Musical. Redmond landed the role and participated in the initial reading, NY Workshop, World Premiere in Atlanta, and the National Tour across the US and Canada.

In 2012, she made her Broadway debut in Bring It On: The Musical, which opened August 1, 2012, and closed December 30, 2012. The musical was nominated for the Tony Award for Best Musical. While touring with the show, Redmond was nominated for various awards for her performance, including Best Featured Performer in a Musical by the Los Angeles Drama Critics Circle. In 2014, she originated the role of Paulette in the musical If/Then which opened March 30, 2014 on Broadway starring Idina Menzel.

In 2015, Redmond starred in the Vineyard Theatre's Off-Broadway production of Gigantic, which premiered on December 3, 2015.

She has held multiple sold-out concerts at 54 Below.

It was announced on January 15, 2019 that Redmond would take over the role of Olaf in the Broadway production of Frozen as of February 19. She is the first woman to perform the role. However, due to the COVID-19 pandemic, all Broadway theatres were closed on March 12, 2020. Disney later announced Frozen would not reopen after the lockdown was lifted.

Credits

Film 

Borderlands (film)  - Ellie (2021), dir. Eli Roth

Theatre 
Broadway

Bring It On - Bridget (2012), dir. Andy Blankenbuehler
If/Then - Paulette and others (2014–15), dir. Michael Greif
Escape to Margaritaville - Ensemble/Tammy (understudy) (2018), dir. Christopher Ashley
Frozen (musical) - Olaf, (2019), dir. Michael Grandage

Off-Broadway

Gigantic, Taylor (2015)

Tour/Regional

Bring It On- Bridget (2011), dir. Andy Blankenbuehler, National Tour
Hairspray- Tracy Turnblad (2015), dir. Dan Knechtges, at The Muny
Legally Blonde- Enid Hoopes (2016), dir. Michael Heitzman, at Music Circus

Other Theatre
String, Clotho (Reading)
Zombies on Broadway, Gertrude/Melissa (Reading)
Girls Just Wanna Have Fun, Harriet (Reading)
City Of, Cammie (Reading)
If/Then, Paulette and others, (2013), Washington D.C. tryout
Too True to Be Good, Mops, workshop
High Fidelity Reunion, Singer
Coney Island Christmas, Evie Slotnik (Reading)
Rockwell: Life on a Palette, Jill (Reading)
Bring it On, Bridget, Atlanta tryout
Books Cook! A Children's Vaudeville, Pigeon, Atlantic Theatre Company
The House of Bernarda Alba, Prudencia, Playwrights Horizons

TV
Local Attraction, Tracy (web series), dir. Connor Hines
Cheer Factor Video Blog, Self (Broadway.com Show)
Younger, Dora, 1 episode

Concerts
54 Below, March/September 2015

Reviews
If/Then reviews:

"Stealing every second that she appears on stage as Paulette and others – Ryann Redmond is someone to keep your eye on."-Oscar E. Moore "from the rear mezzanine" for Talk Entertainment.com

"In the fourth song on the album, Jerry Dixon's character, Stephen, asks Elizabeth to join forces with him for a new urban planning job, and we finally get to hear some of the unique voices of the If/Then ensemble. (Look out for standout voices in Ryann Redmond at 1:21 and Tamika Lawrence at 1:33!)"
-Michael Gioia, Playbill

Bring it On reviews:

"There are winning comic turns from Redmond and Haney, in particular. Their be-yourself anthem, 'It Ain't No Thing,' sung by La Cienega, Nautica and Bridget, is the show's best number." -David Rooney, The Hollywood Reporter

"Her fellow redistrictee, the chubby Bridget (an endearing Ryann Redmond), finds the outré fashion sense that qualified her as a freak at Truman gives her some street cachet at Jackson. Both girls acquire adoring, cute boyfriends with skin tones a few shades darker than theirs." -Charles Isherwood, The New York Times

"But things start cooking at the black school, with help from characters like chubby white girl, winningly played by Ryann Redmond, who's got pipes, charm, and a future that should take her beyond just Hairspray revivals."
Michael Musto, The Village Voice

"It's nearly impossible to overcredit this thrilling young cast, most of them Broadway newcomers. 
As for show-stealers, well, it's a talent melee: Ryann Redmond slays us as Bridget, a nerdy, big-boned laugh-track of a cheer-wannabe who ends up with her own storyline." -Scott Brown, New York Magazine
 
"Stealing the show are Ryann Redmond and Nicolas Womack as Bridget, Campbell's chunky sidekick, and Twig, the skinny rapper who likes his girls full-figured. I kept imagining the two as Hildy and Chip in 'On the Town.' They'd be terrific." -Erik Haagensen, Backstage.com

"The delightful Ryann Redmond all but steals the show as an outcast-turned-cool-girl." -Joe Dziemianowicz, NY Daily News

"Redmond as Bridget is an astounding triple threat talent to keep one's eyes on." -Don Grigware, BroadwayWorld Los Angeles

"One standout, Ryann Redmond, nails every scene she's in." -Timothy Kuryak, BroadwayWorld Los Angeles

"Redmond has a strong voice and does some amazing vocal gymnastics –not to mention some stupendous actual gymnastics toward the end of the show." -Linda Hodges, BroadwayWorld San Francisco

"The scene-stealer is Redmond, who is a star in the making.  She possesses impeccable comic timing and a pleasant singing style. She shines in the morality piece "It Ain't No Thing," which addresses feeling good about yourself."- Jeff Favre, L.A. Downtown News

"It's Ryann Redmond as oddball Bridget, rapping about her extra junk in the trunk who steals the show with a little extra sweat."-CBS Los Angeles

Awards and nominations
2011 Atlanta Theatre Fan Award for Best Featured Actress in a Musical for Bring It On (nominated)
2011 Suzi Bass Award for Best Featured Actress in a Musical for Bring It On (nominated)
2011 Los Angeles Drama Critics Circle Award for Best Featured Actress in a Musical for Bring It On (nominated)
2011 BroadwayWorld Atlanta Award for Best Actress in a Musical (Professional) for Bring It On (won)
2011 LA Ticketholder Award for Best Supporting Actress in a Musical for Bring It On (won)
2012 Back Stage Garland Award for Best Performance in a Musical for Bring It On (won)

References

External links
 
 

Living people
American musical theatre actresses
People from Alpharetta, Georgia
People from Cumming, Georgia
Actresses from Georgia (U.S. state)
Year of birth missing (living people)
21st-century American women